Evil Under the Sun is a 1982 British mystery film based on the 1941 novel of the same name by Agatha Christie and directed by Guy Hamilton. Peter Ustinov stars as Hercule Poirot, the Belgian detective whom he had previously played in Death on the Nile (1978).

Plot
A hiker finds a dead woman on the North York Moors in England. The victim had been strangled and is identified as Alice Ruber. Around the same time, Belgian detective Hercule Poirot is asked by an insurance company to examine a diamond ring belonging to millionaire industrialist Sir Horace Blatt. Poirot agrees that it is a fake and assures the company that Sir Horace would have given a real diamond to his mistress Arlena Stuart Marshall; she had apparently returned a fake version after their split. Poirot agrees to meet Marshall at an exclusive Adriatic Sea island and confront her. The hotel is the former summer palace of the reigning King of Tyrania, now owned by Daphne Castle, who had received the palace "for services rendered".

Sir Horace's former mistress Arlena is an actress and is on holiday with her husband Kenneth. Arlena is emotionally abusive to his daughter, Linda, and flirts with Patrick Redfern who is married to Christine. Patrick is on the island only because Arlena arranged and paid for it. Kenneth turns to his old friend, Daphne, who is horrified  by the way the way that Arlena treats both him and Linda. Arlena has also caused financial trouble for theatrical producers Odell and Myra Gardener, who are also at the resort, by walking out of a major play and refusing a role in another. Writer Rex Brewster has already spent the royalties advanced to him for a tell-all biography of Arlena, but she refuses to give him a release for the biography, angering him. Early on the third morning, Arlena takes a paddle-boat to Ladder Bay. Patrick and Myra go for a boat trip around the island and see a body lying motionless on the beach. Patrick approaches the body and recognises Arlena, announcing that she has been strangled. Poirot must determine which of his seven fellow guests, or Sir Horace or Daphne, is the murderer.

Daphne had heard Kenneth in his room typing at the time of the murder, and Christine was with Linda at Gull Cove and did not leave until 11:55 for a 12:30 tennis match. Sir Horace argued with Arlena about the diamond at Ladder Bay at 11:30, which was confirmed by his yacht crew and by Daphne. Arlena kept the diamond, promising an explanation that evening, and Poirot finds the fake jewel nearby in a grotto. Patrick left at 11:30 with Myra, seeing Sir Horace's yacht coming, and hearing the noon day cannon firing. Rex met Linda when entering Gull Cove at 12:00 and reports that a bottle flung from the top of a cliff nearly hit him. Odell was seen reading by Daphne and her staff. He claims low water pressure hindered his 12:15 wash before tennis, but nobody admits to bathing at that time.

Assembling the suspects together, Poirot accuses Christine and Patrick of the crime: Christine knocked out Arlena and hid her in the nearby grotto, and Patrick strangled the helpless Arlena later. Christine posed as Arlena with makeup to simulate a suntan, Arlena's swimsuit and large red hat, to be purposely mis-identified by Patrick in Myra's presence. But Poirot had smelt Arlena's perfume in the grotto. Christine set Linda's watch twenty minutes fast, suggested she wear a swim cap to muffle the noon cannon, and corrected the watch afterwards. She tossed out the lotion bottle, almost hitting Rex, and washed off her tan, thus depriving the hotel's poor water system of pressure. Poirot suspects that Patrick switched Sir Horace's jewel with a copy and that Patrick and Christine killed Arlena to conceal the theft. The Redferns scoff at the detective's accusations, and point out that he has no real evidence.

On going to leave the hotel, Patrick pays by cheque, signing the "R" in "Redfern" in a distinctive way that Poirot recognises as being the same way "Felix Ruber", husband of the Yorkshire moor victim, signed his name. The hiker who found the body had been Christine, establishing Patrick's alibi. Poirot knows photos from the British police will show Patrick and Felix to be the same person. Patrick puts a pipe in his mouth that has never been lit during his stay; Poirot empties the pipe bowl to reveal the genuine diamond. Patrick punches Poirot unconscious. The closing scene shows Daphne feeding the now conscious Poirot and informing him that the king is awarding him the Order of St Goodwin The Inquisitive, First Class, as Kenneth and Linda look on smiling. Meanwhile, several members of Daphne's staff are shown holding the Redferns prisoner on the island's shuttle boat on the way to the mainland while Blatt, Brewster, and the Gardners gleefully taunt the murderous couple with a champagne toast from Blatt's yacht.

Cast
As end credits
 Peter Ustinov as Hercule Poirot
 Colin Blakely as Sir Horace Blatt
 Jane Birkin as Christine Redfern
 Nicholas Clay as Patrick Redfern
 Maggie Smith as Daphne Castle
 Roddy McDowall as Rex Brewster
 Sylvia Miles as Myra Gardener
 James Mason as Odell Gardener
 Denis Quilley as Kenneth Marshall
 Diana Rigg as Arlena Stuart Marshall
 Emily Hone as Linda Marshall

Production
EMI Films had a big success with Murder on the Orient Express (1974). In 1975 head of production Nat Cohen announced the same producers would adapt the Evil Under the Sun novel as part of a slate of six films worth £6 million, also including Spanish Fly (1975), Aces High (1976), The Likely Lads (1976) and Sweeney! (1977). EMI ended up making all these films except Evil Under the Sun. In May 1977 EMI announced they would make not one but two Christie adaptations, Death on the Nile (1978) and Evil Under the Sun. Initially only the former was made, which introduced Peter Ustinov as Hercule Poirot.

In March 1981 Barry Spikings announced EMI would make Evil Under the Sun at a budget of $10 million. Producer Richard Goodwin said, "What we try to do is provide terrific escapist entertainment that you can take your kids to and make it look beautiful at the same time."

The screenplay was written by Anthony Shaffer (who had worked on Murder on the Orient Express and Death on the Nile) and an uncredited Barry Sandler. The adaptation stayed fairly close to Christie's work but truncated scenes for time constraints, removed minor characters, and added humorous elements that were not present in the novel. Additionally, the novel was set in Devon, but the film was set on an Adriatic island in the fictional kingdom of Tyrania (based on Albania). The characters of Rosamund Darnley and Mrs. Castle were merged creating Daphne Castle, played by Smith. The characters of Major Barry, Inspector Colgate and Reverend Stephen Lane were omitted, and the female character of Emily Brewster was written as a man named Rex Brewster, played by McDowall.

The film was directed by Guy Hamilton, who had previously directed The Mirror Crack'd in 1980 for the same producers. Hamilton said, "I think one of the reasons the books and films are so popular is that people know what to expect, though now we try to add a few surprises."

Costumes were designed by Anthony Powell who had won the Academy Award for Best Costume Design in 1979 for his work on Death on the Nile.

While promoting the film, Peter Ustinov said he was going to do another Poirot film set in Jordan but they could not make it yet because the country did not yet have the facilities. Richard Goodwin did not want to make another one for a few years, saying, "We don't want to overdo them". It was likely this was Appointment with Death, which ended up being produced by Cannon Films and released in 1988. Ustinov returned as Poirot and Anthony Shaffer co-wrote the script; his fourth adaptation of a Christie novel.

Casting
Peter Ustinov made his second film appearance as Poirot, having previously played the Belgian detective in Death on the Nile (1978). He said, "I think it's a better script than the first one I did. And much more fun." He also declared, "I find Poirot a very engaging character, although he's quite awful, really. I should hate to know him. He's very vain, self-contained and finicky. People have asked me why he never married - because he couldn't solve it, of course. An ancillary reason is that he's very much in love with himself. He has probably been quite true to himself. I don't think he's ever cheated on himself."

Maggie Smith and Jane Birkin also appeared in both films. Denis Quilley and Colin Blakely appeared in the earlier Brabourne-produced Murder on the Orient Express (1974).

Diana Rigg was cast as what she called "the archetypal actress bitch."

Nicholas Clay was cast in a key role. Guy Hamilton said, "I was looking for someone like Stewart Granger or Michael Rennie - handsome, dashing, physical, romantic. Nick has it all. A fine sense of timing, the right looks and a good physique."

Sylvia Miles based her role on Broadway producer Terry Allen Kramer. "I never met her, but I figured that's what a producer should be like."

Filming locations

The film was shot at Lee International Studios in Wembley, London, and on location in Majorca, Spain in May 1981. The Majorca location was suggested by director Guy Hamilton, who had lived there for several years.

The actual island used for aerial shots is Sa Dragonera, an uninhabited islet with "natural park" status, located just off the west coast of Majorca near Sant Elm. Other locations used were Cala Blanca as Ladder Bay, and offshore at Sant Elm for the south of France (Sir Horace's boat scenes). 'Gull Cove' is the remote Cala en Feliu on the Formentor Peninsula. The other hotel exterior shots were filmed at the  Estate in Bunyola, a large Italianate villa surrounded by gardens. Once owned by the German designer Jil Sander, it was subsequently purchased by the Island Council of Majorca. Finally, Poirot boards his boat to the island from Cala de Deià, the cove below the village of Deià.

The early scenes on the moors were shot in the Yorkshire Dales, England, with the exterior of the police station being the former Literary Institute in Muker, Swaledale.

Award nomination

Sequels 
The film was followed by several made-for-television films (Thirteen At Dinner, Murder In Three Acts, Dead Man's Folly) starring Ustinov, as well as the feature film Appointment With Death in 1988, which marked his final portrayal of Hercule Poirot.

Notes

References

External links
 
 
 
 

1982 films
1980s mystery films
1980s historical films
British historical films
British mystery films
Films based on Hercule Poirot books
Films directed by Guy Hamilton
Films with screenplays by Anthony Shaffer
Films set in hotels
Films set in 1941
Films set on islands
Films set in the Mediterranean Sea
Films shot in Mallorca
EMI Films films
1980s English-language films
1980s British films